The Colossi of Memnon ( or es-Salamat) are two massive stone statues of the Pharaoh Amenhotep III, which stand at the front of the ruined Mortuary Temple of Amenhotep III, the largest temple in the Theban Necropolis. They have stood since 1350 BC, and were well known to ancient Greeks and Romans, as well as early modern travelers and Egyptologists. The statues contain 107 Roman-era inscriptions in Greek and Latin, dated to between AD 20 and 250; many of these inscriptions on the northernmost statue make reference to the Greek mythological king Memnon, whom the statue was then – erroneously – thought to represent.

Scholars have debated how the identification of the northern colossus as "Memnon" is connected to the Greek name for the entire Theban Necropolis as the Memnonium.

Description 
The twin statues depict Amenhotep III (fl. 14th century BC) in a seated position, his hands resting on his knees and his gaze facing eastwards (actually ESE in modern bearings) towards the river. Two shorter figures are carved into the front throne alongside his legs: these are his wife Tiye and mother Mutemwiya. The side panels depict the Nile god Hapi.

The statues are made from blocks of quartzite sandstone which was quarried at el-Gabal el-Ahmar (near modern-day Cairo) and transported  overland to Thebes (Luxor). The stones are believed to be too heavy to have been transported upstream on the Nile. The blocks used by later Roman engineers to reconstruct the northern colossus may have come from Edfu (north of Aswan). Including the stone platforms on which they stand – themselves about  – the colossi reach  in height and weigh an estimated 720 tons each.

Both statues are quite damaged, with the features above the waist virtually unrecognizable. The southern statue comprises a single piece of stone, but the northern figure has a large extensive crack in the lower half and above the waist consists of 5 tiers of stone. These upper levels consist of a different type of sandstone, and are the result of a later reconstruction attempt, which William de Wiveleslie Abney attributed to Septimius Severus. It is believed that originally the two statues were identical to each other, although inscriptions and minor art may have varied.

The original function of the Colossi was to stand guard at the entrance to Amenhotep's memorial temple (or mortuary temple): a massive construct built during the pharaoh's lifetime, where he was worshipped as a god-on-earth both before and after his departure from this world. In its day, this temple complex was the largest and most opulent in Ancient Egypt.

With the exception of the Colossi, however, very little remains today of Amenhotep's temple. It stood on the edge of the Nile floodplain, and successive annual inundations gnawed away at its foundations – a 1840s lithograph by David Roberts shows the Colossi surrounded by water – and it was not unknown for later rulers to dismantle, purloin, and reuse portions of their predecessors' monuments.

Roman era inscriptions
The statues contain 107 Roman-era inscriptions in Greek and Latin, dated between 20-250CE; these inscriptions allowed modern travellers to connect the statues to the classical Greek and Latin literature. Many of the inscriptions include the name "Memnon".

They were first studied in detail by Jean-Antoine Letronne in his 1831 La statue vocale de Memnon considérée dans ses rapports avec l'Égypte et la Grèce and then catalogued in the second volume (1848) of his Recueil des inscriptions grecques et latines de l'Égypte.

Earthquakes 

Soon after its construction the temple was destroyed by an earthquake, recently dated by the Armenian Institute of Seismology to around 1200 BC, which left only the two huge colossi at the entrance still standing. These were further destroyed by an earthquake in 27 BC, after which they were partly reconstructed by the Roman authorities.

The 1200 BC earthquake also opened numerous chasms in the ground which meant that many statues were buried, some in pristine condition. These have been the subject of extensive restoration and excavation conducted by the Armenian/German archaeologist Hourig Sourouzian, who has revealed that the complex consisted of three pylons, each fronted by colossal statues, while at the far end a rectangular Temple complex consisted of a peristyle court surrounded by columns. So far four of the statues have been re-erected, with eight waiting to be re-erected, while some 200 statues or pieces of statues are in the Luxor Museum, some on display, others in store awaiting conservation.

Name 
The modern Arabic name is Kom el-Hatan, but it is generally known by the Roman name as the Temple of Memnon. Memnon was a hero of the Trojan War, a King of Ethiopia who led his armies from Africa into Asia Minor to help defend the beleaguered city but was ultimately slain by Achilles. Memnon (whose name means  or ) was said to be the son of Eos, the goddess of dawn. Eventually, the entire Theban Necropolis became generally referred to as the Memnonium making him "Ruler of the west" as in the case of the god Osiris who was called chief of the west.

in the 19th century, William de Wiveleslie Abney noted that "(t)he Arabs called these statues 'Shama' and 'Tama', and when speaking of them together gave them the appelation of Sanamât, or the idols."

Sounds 

In 27 BCE, a large earthquake reportedly shattered the northern colossus, collapsing it from the waist up and cracking the lower half. Following its rupture, the remaining lower half of this statue was then reputed to "sing" on various occasions – always within an hour or two of sunrise, usually right at dawn. The sound was most often reported in February or March, but this is probably more a reflection of the tourist season rather than any actual pattern.

The earliest report in literature is that of the Greek historian and geographer Strabo, who said that he heard the sound during a visit in 20 BCE, by which time it apparently was already well-known. The description varied; Strabo said it sounded "like a blow", Pausanias compared it to "the string of a lyre" breaking, but it also was described as the striking of brass or whistling. Other ancient sources include Pliny (not from personal experience, but he collected other reports), Pausanias, Tacitus, Philostratus and Juvenal. In addition, the base of the statue is inscribed with about 90 surviving inscriptions of contemporary tourists reporting whether they had heard the sound or not.

The legend of the "Vocal Memnon", the luck that hearing it was reputed to bring, and the reputation of the statue's oracular powers became known outside of Egypt, and a constant stream of visitors, including several Roman emperors, came to marvel at the statues. The last recorded reliable mention of the sound dates from 196. Sometime later in the Roman era, the upper tiers of sandstone were added (the original remains of the top half have never been found); the date of this reconstruction is unknown, but local tradition places it circa 199, and attributes it to the Roman Emperor Septimius Severus in an attempt to curry favour with the oracle (it is known that he visited the statue, but did not hear the sound).

Various explanations have been offered for the phenomenon; these are of two types: natural or man-made. Strabo himself apparently was too far away to be able to determine its nature: he reported that he could not determine if it came from the pedestal, the shattered upper area, or "the people standing around at the base". If natural, the sound was probably caused by rising temperatures and the evaporation of dew inside the porous rock.

Similar sounds, although much rarer, have been heard from some of the other Egyptian monuments (Karnak is the usual location for more modern reports). Perhaps the most convincing argument against it being the result of human agents is that it did cease, probably due to the added weight of the reconstructed upper tiers

A few mentions of the sound in the early modern era (late 18th and early 19th centuries) seem to be hoaxes, either by the writers or perhaps by locals perpetuating the phenomenon.

The "Vocal Memnon" features prominently in one scene of Henrik Ibsen's Peer Gynt.

They also show up in Oscar Wilde's fairy tale "The Happy Prince."

Gallery

Modern images

Notable historical images

See also 
 Colossal red granite statue of Amenhotep III
 List of largest monoliths

References

Citations

Bibliography 
 Lord Curzon: "The Voice of Memnon" in Tales of Travel (1923)
 Rupert T. Gould: "Three Strange Sounds: The Cry of Memnon" in Enigmas: Another Book of Unexplained Facts (1929)
 Armin Wirsching: "Excursion on transport and erection of the Colossi" in: Armin Wirsching: Obelisken transportieren und aufrichten in Aegypten und in Rom (3rd ed. 2013)

External links 

 Colossus of Memnon (Nova/PBS)
 Book XVII, Strabo's Geography
 Description by Count de Forbin
 David Roberts: Statues of Memnon Thebes Decr 4th 1838

Buildings and structures completed in the 14th century BC
Colossal statues in Egypt
Sculptures of ancient Egypt
Theban Necropolis
Amenhotep III
Unidentified sounds
Stone sculptures